Massabi is a commune of Angola, located in Cacongo municipality in province of Cabinda.

See also 

 Communes of Angola

References 

Provincial capitals in Angola
Populated places in Cabinda Province
Port cities and towns in Angola
Municipalities of Angola